The 2011 Uzbekistan Cup Final was the final match of the 2011 Uzbekistan Cup, the 19th season of the Uzbek Cup, a football competition for the 36 teams in the Uzbek League and Uzbek League Division One. The match was contested by FC Pakhtakor and Nasaf Qarshi, at Pakhtakor Markaziy Stadium in Tashkent, on November 13, 2011.

Road to the final

Match

References

Cup
2011